Vidalia (  vye-DAYL-yə) is a city located primarily in Toombs County, Georgia, United States. The city also extends very slightly into Montgomery County. As of the 2020 census, the city population was 10,785.

Vidalia is the principal city of the Vidalia Micropolitan Statistical Area, a micropolitan area that covers Montgomery and Toombs counties, and had a combined population of 35,640 at the 2020 census.

Description and history 
The town was incorporated on January 1, 1890. It is the largest city in Toombs County, but it is not the county seat. The original name for the town was "Jenkins Station", after a local landowner, Warren T. Jenkins. Although several origins for the town's modern name have been suggested, it was most likely given by a daughter of Samuel Hawkins, the president of the Savannah, Americus and Montgomery Railroad (later the S.A.M shortline), though which of his four daughters suggested the name, or how she came to it, is not known.

Like many towns in the region, Vidalia grew up around a rail yard that served farmers in the area who grew such crops as pecans and tobacco. The area's famous onions were not an important crop until much later.

From 1952 to 1956, Vidalia was home to the Vidalia Indians, a Class D minor league baseball affiliate of the Cleveland Indians. Vidalia played in the Georgia State League and won the 1953 League Championship.

In the 1950s, Piggly Wiggly grocery stores opened a distribution center in Vidalia, bringing with it a large influx of jobs as well as railroad business.  At that time, Vidalia served as an interchange junction between the Seaboard Air Line Railroad and the Georgia and Florida. For this, a large seven-track yard was constructed, as well as a sizable engine servicing facility and interchange yard. The latter, smaller interchange yard is still in use to some degree by the Georgia Central Railway, while the larger yard was removed sometime in the 1970s. Dot Foods currently occupies most of the old Piggly Wiggly distribution center, with smaller companies leasing space.

Geography
Vidalia is located in northwestern Toombs County at  (32.215305, -82.410086). The westernmost part of the city is in northeastern Montgomery County.

The city is located along U.S. Route 280, which runs east–west through the center of town. U.S. 280 leads east  to Lyons, the Toombs county seat, and southwest  to Mount Vernon, the Montgomery county seat. Other highways that run through the city include Georgia State Routes 15, 130, 292, and 297.

The city is drained to the south by Rocky Creek and to the north by Swift Creek; both are part of the Ohoopee River watershed.

Demographics

2020 census

As of the 2020 United States census, there were 10,785 people, 4,042 households, and 2,499 families residing in the city.

2000 census

As of the census of 2000, there were 10,491 people, 4,167 households, and 2,758 families residing in the city; of these, 160 people lived in Montgomery and the rest in Toombs counties. The racial makeup of the city was 59.61% White, 36.88% African American, 0.89% Asian, 0.14% Native American, 1.82% from other races, and 0.66% from two or more races. Hispanic or Latino of any race were 3.24% of the population.

There were 4,167 households, out of which 32.4% had children under the age of 18 living with them, 43.7% were married couples living together, 18.5% had a female householder with no husband present, and 33.8% were non-families. 30.5% of all households were made up of individuals, and 12.7% had someone living alone who was 65 years of age or older.  The average household size was 2.46 and the average family size was 3.06.

In the city, the population was spread out, with 27.9% under the age of 18, 8.5% from 18 to 24, 26.5% from 25 to 44, 22.2% from 45 to 64, and 14.8% who were 65 years of age or older.  The median age was 36 years. For every 100 females, there were 81.4 males.  For every 100 females age 18 and over, there were 76.6 males.

The median income for a household in the city was $28,365, and the median income for a family was $40,091. Males had a median income of $30,180 versus $18,496 for females. The per capita income for the city was $16,369.  About 15.4% of families and 19.9% of the population were below the poverty line, including 29.5% of those under age 18 and 18.8% of those age 65 or over.

Economy 
Vidalia has a mixed economy, but its largest industry is agriculture. Since 1931, Granex onions grown in and near Vidalia have been licensed and sold internationally as Vidalia onions. In 1986, the Vidalia Onion Trademark Act granted a state trademark and protection on the onions of the Vidalia and Toombs County area. The 1989 Federal Marketing Order #955 of the USDA Agricultural Marketing Service gave the growers and handlers the legal rights to establish the Vidalia Onion Committee, and it granted U.S. federal protection of the onion's name and production.

Onions 
Vidalia is best known for its "sweet" onions. The Vidalia onion was first produced about 1931 when a farmer named Mose Coleman discovered that the onions he produced were sweeter than other onions. Other farmers started growing the same crop, and in the 1940s the Vidalia onion became an item sold to tourists.

Vidalia onion growers have protected their brand, and today all onions labelled Vidalia must be grown in one of thirteen different counties in Georgia or in specific portions of seven other counties. Because of their taste and reputation, they are able to command an increased price in the marketplace.

In 1990, the Vidalia onion was named as the official vegetable of the state of Georgia.

Arts and culture

Annual cultural events
Each spring Vidalia holds a world-famous Vidalia Onion Festival. The event lasts for five days and draws in many tourists with its wide variety of activities.

Museums and other points of interest
The Altama Gallery is a museum of history and art located inside the restored Brazell House.

The Vidalia Onion Museum provides guests with an interactive, historical experience. The  space is filled with an array of education exhibits that highlight the sweet onion's economic, cultural and culinary significance. Located at 100 Vidalia Sweet Onion Drive.

Education

Public schools

Vidalia Public Schools are part of the Vidalia City School District. The school district holds pre-school to grade twelve, and consists of two elementary schools, a middle school, and a high school. The district has 144 full-time teachers and over 2,408 students.
J.D. Dickerson Primary School
Sally Dailey Meadows Elementary School
J.R. Trippe Middle School
Vidalia Comprehensive High School
Edward D Phillips Special Education Center.

Private
 The Paul Anderson Youth Home offers faith-based accredited preparatory education and substance abuse treatment to at-risk youth.
 Vidalia Heritage Academy provides development of character and academic excellence from a Christian perspective in a Christian environment for Preschool, Elementary School, and Middle/High School youth.

Notable people

Paul Anderson, Olympic weightlifter and strongman; founder of Paul Anderson Youth Home in Vidalia
Mel Blount, former Pittsburgh Steelers defensive back, five-time Pro Bowler and Pro Football Hall of Fame inductee; born in Vidalia
Paul Claxton, professional golfer; born in Vidalia
Don Harris, NBC News correspondent killed during Jonestown Massacre; born in Vidalia
Carl Simpson, football player; born in Vidalia
Fred Stokes, defensive end who played ten seasons in National Football League; born in Vidalia

References

External links
 
 
 City of Vidalia entry from the State of Georgia government portal
 Vidalia Convention & Visitors Bureau
 Vidalia Onion official website
 The Wall Street Journal - "The Onion's Best Friend Is an Ogre"

Cities in Georgia (U.S. state)
Micropolitan areas of Georgia (U.S. state)
Cities in Montgomery County, Georgia
Cities in Toombs County, Georgia
Vidalia, Georgia, micropolitan area